Molenberg (literally Millhill) is a former mining colony in the south-western part of Heerlen, southeastern Netherlands.

When work started in 1913 it was called Molenbergpark (Millhillpark).

The mining colony was created to house mining executives (alongside the slope of the hill, towards the centre of Heerlen), engineers (alongside the mean road), and miners.

Although much of the plan logical work was done by architect Jan Stuyt, there are/were also buildings designed by Frits Peutz (Land house attorney Wijnands, 1919, the Broederschool (school building) 1921, Kapel Broederhuis, 1932), Theo Boosten (church Pius X (now demolished), 1961), and C. Franssen & J. Franssen (church Verschijning van de Onbevlekte Maagd, 1926).

The first house were completed in 1916, in 1918 a second project was started, and between 1928-1938 the centre of Molenberg was filled.

In 1951 the construction of another part was started, called the "Witte Wijk", designed by Jos Klijnen.

References

Populated places in Limburg (Netherlands)
Heerlen